Jelaska is a surname. Notable people with the surname include:
 
Davor Jelaska (1907–1995), Croatian rower
Ane Jelaska, Croatian soap opera character

See also
Jelanka